Automation engineering is the provision of automated solutions to physical activities and industries.

Automation engineer 
Automation engineers are experts who have the knowledge and ability to design, create, develop and manage machines and systems, for example, factory automation, process automation and warehouse automation.
Automation technicians are also involved.

Scope 
Automation engineering is the integration of standard engineering fields.
Automatic control of various control system for operating various systems or machines to reduce human efforts & time to increase accuracy. Automation engineers design and service electromechanical devices and systems to high-speed robotics and programmable logic controllers (PLCs).

Work and career after graduation 
Graduates can work for both government and private sector entities such as industrial production, 
companies that create and use automation systems, for example paper industry, automotive industry, food and agricultural industry, water treatment, and oil & gas sector such as refineries, power plants.

Job Description 
Automation engineers can design, program, simulate and test automated machinery and processes, and usually are employed in industries such as the energy sector in plants, car manufacturing facilities or food processing plants and robots. Automation engineers are responsible for creating detailed design specifications and other documents, developing automation  based on specific requirements for the process involved, and conforming to international standards like IEC-61508, local standards, and other process specific guidelines and specifications, simulate, test and commission electronic equipment for automation.

See also
Control engineering
Mechatronics engineering

References

Engineering disciplines